Gilberton is a rural locality in the Shire of Etheridge, Queensland, Australia.

Geography 
The old Gilberton township lies within a cattle station (privately owned by one family since 1869, which was established on the Ewamian Aboriginal land. The only remains of the town is the stone fortress that was built by the Martell family in 1869. The date palm on the northern side of the Gilbert River is the site of the Corbett store.

The Gilbert River flows from the south-east to the north-west of the locality and then travels northward towards its mouth at the Gulf of Carpentaria. Gilberton Station neighbors  Rungullla National Park.

The terrain is mountainous with the Newcastle Range in the north-east of the locality and Gilbert Range in the east of the locality. There are a number of named peaks, from north to south:

 Mount Moran
 North Knob
 Middle Knob
 Conical Hill
 Commissioners Hill
 Hanns Table Mountain
 South Knob

 Black Cap
 Mount Rous

History 
The name Gilberton comes from the Gilbert River, which in turn was named by explorer Ludwig Leichhardt on 12 July 1845, after his expedition member John Gilbert who was killed near the Carpentaria coast on 28 June 1845.

Heritage listings
Gilberton has a number of heritage-listed sites, including:
 Forsayth-Agate Creek - Ortona (Iona) Station Road: Ortona Mine and Battery[9]
 New Woolgar Road: Mount Moran Battery
 Joseph Morris Mine

Education 
There are no schools in Gilberton. The nearest primary school is Forsayth State School in neighbouring Forsayth to the north but it is a considerable distance away. There are no nearby secondary schools. Distance education or boarding schools would be options.

References

 
Towns in Queensland
Shire of Etheridge
Localities in Queensland